Klug is a surname. Notable people with the surname include:

 Johann Christoph Friedrich Klug (1775–1856), German entomologist
 Bernd Klug (1914–1975), German naval officer
 Al Klug (1920–1957), American football player
 Aaron Klug (1926–2018), Lithuanian-born chemist
 Brian Klug (fl. late 20th century), academic in U.K.
 Howard Klug (fl. c. 2000), American clarinetist & academic
 Scott L. Klug (born 1953), American politician
 Bryan Klug (born 1960), English footballer
 John Klug (born 1965), Australian footballer
 Gerald Klug (born 1968), Austrian politician
 Chris Klug (born 1972), American snowboarder
 Gerard Christopher Klug, American game designer
 Yolanda Klug (born 1995/1996), missing German who disappeared in 2019
 Joel Klug, American reality show contestant

Surnames from nicknames
Jewish surnames